Mountains of the Dingle Peninsula may refer to:

 Brandon Group, a mountain range in the western Dingle peninsula
 Mountains of the Central Dingle Peninsula, a mountain range in the central Dingle peninsula
 Slieve Mish Mountains, a mountain range in the eastern Dingle peninsula

Mountains and hills of County Kerry